Squires of San Quentin is a 1978 American short documentary film produced by J. Gary Mitchell. It was nominated for an Academy Award for Best Documentary Short. The film was shot in San Quentin State Prison and depicts "The Squires", inmates who attempt to convince troubled children to avoid criminal behavior.

References

External links
Squires of San Quentin at the J. Gary Mitchell Film Company

1978 documentary films
1978 short films
1978 films
American short documentary films
Documentary films about incarceration in the United States
Films set in San Quentin State Prison
Films shot in San Quentin, California
1970s short documentary films
1970s English-language films
1970s American films